The Olugbo of Ugbo Kingdom is a Paramount Yoruba king of Ugbo Kingdom, in Ilaje local government area of  Ondo State, southwestern Nigeria.
The King is generally called "Olugbo" or "Oghone". An heir to the throne from the royal families
is often appointed by the council of chiefs and the King-makers following an Ifa consultations.

Ruling families
Ugbo Kingdom is ruled by heir appointed from the ruling families and the current Olugbo of Ugbo Kingdom is Oba Fredrick Obateru Akinruntan, a Nigerian billionaire, Oil magnate and founder of Obat Oil, one of Nigeria's largest and leading Oil Privately held company. Ascension to the Olugbo throne is rotational between the Agbedun/Ojogo and Oyetayo/Atarioye sections of Ojadele ruling house.

Obateru was installed in 2009, after Oba Banjo Mafimisebi was dethroned following a suit by another royal family who nominated and endorsed Obateru as their candidate.
The incumbent Olugbo of Ugbo Kingdom is ranked by Forbes magazine as the 2nd richest King in Africa and the richest in Nigeria. He surpassed King Olubuse II, the Ooni of Ife with $225 million and the Swaziland billionaire, King Mswati III by over $200 million to become the second-richest African king in 2014.

References

Yoruba royal titles